Harry Combs may refer to:

 Harry Combs (politician) (1881–1954), New Zealand politician
 Harry B. Combs (1913–2003), American aviation pioneer and author

See also
Harry Combes